Aleksandar Varbanov (born May 9, 1964) was a weightlifter for Bulgaria. Varbanov is one of the greatest weightlifters of all-time. Alexander has the 9th highest Sinclair ever of 485.78 made up of a 167.5 kg snatch and a 215 kg clean and jerk at under 75 kg in body weight! He is without a doubt the greatest clean and jerker of that bodyweight of all-time. As well as being a sensational athlete, Alexander Varbanov was part of the most dominant team in weightlifting history: The Bulgarian national team of the 1980s. He was also coached by the most successful coach of all-time, the great Ivan Abadjiev, a man whom Varbanov referred to as being ‘closer to me than my father. Alex has won numerous World Championships and European Championships in the 67.5 and 75 kg bodyweight divisions and a Bronze Medal from the 1988 Olympics in Seoul, South Korea. He has earned 10 official world records two still current to this date, 215.5 kg Clean and Jerk and 382.5 kg Total. He started training in 1977. Until 1981 he was a competitor of the native Novi Pazar. Then in the period 1981-1984 he competed for CSKA Sofia. Then until 1990 he was part of the Levski club. From 1990 to 1995 Varbanov competed for the German team AC Mutterstadt in Weightlifting Bundesliga. He has built a strong reputation of a weightlifting professional. He has a Master’s degree from the National Sports Academy of Bulgaria and is a Honored Master of Sports. Alex is NCCP certified Olympic Weightlifting Competition Development coach (Level 2). He now lives and works as a weightlifting trainer in Toronto, Ontario, Canada.

Weightlifting achievements 
 Bronze medalist in Olympic Games (1988);
 Senior world champion (1983, 1985 and 1986);
 Silver medalist in Senior World Championships (1987);
 Senior European champion (1983, 1985, 1986 and 1987);
 Silver medalist at Senior European Championships (1984 and 1989);
 Silver medalist of the 1984 Friendship Games;
 Silver medalist of the 1985 and 1987 World cup finals;
 Bronze medalist of the 1986 World cup final;
 Third place in the final standings of the World Cup 1985 and 1986
 Second place in the final standings of the World Cup 1987
 Gold medalist of the World Cup tournaments Varna 1982, Varna 1983, Varna 1984, Dobrich 1986, Plovdiv 1988;
 Junior World vice-champion (1981);
 European Junior champion (1982);
 European Junior vice-champion (1981);
 Balkan champion 1982, 1983 and 1985
 Four-time champion of Bulgaria (1982, 1983, 1984, 1985);
 Five times Junior and Youth champion of Bulgaria (1979, 1980, 1981, 1982, 1983);
 Set ten world records during his career.

Career bests 
 Clean and jerk: 200.0 kg on September 13, 1984, in Varna in class to 67.5 kg.
 Clean and jerk: 215.5 kg on May 12, 1987, in Seoul in the class to 75 kg.
 Total (snatch + clean and jerk): 382.5 kg on February 20, 1988, in Plovdiv in the class to 75 kg.

References 

1964 births
Living people
Bulgarian male weightlifters
Olympic weightlifters of Bulgaria
Weightlifters at the 1988 Summer Olympics
Olympic bronze medalists for Bulgaria
Olympic medalists in weightlifting
People from Novi Pazar, Bulgaria
Medalists at the 1988 Summer Olympics
World record setters in weightlifting
European Weightlifting Championships medalists
World Weightlifting Championships medalists